Miyakea is a genus of moths in the family Crambidae

Miyakea may also refer to:

Miyakea, a genus of plants in the family Ranunculaceae, now called Pulsatilla
Miyakea, a genus of mantis shrimp in the family Squillidae, now called Miyakella